Chow mein ( and , ; Pinyin: chǎomiàn) is a Chinese dish made from stir-fried noodles with vegetables and sometimes meat or tofu. Over the centuries, variations of chǎomiàn were developed in many regions of China; there are several methods of frying the noodles and a range of toppings can be used. It was introduced in other countries by Chinese immigrants. The dish is popular throughout the Chinese diaspora and appears on the menus of most Chinese restaurants abroad. It is particularly popular in India, Nepal, the UK, and the US.

Etymology 
'Chow mein' is the Americanization of the Chinese term chaomian. Its pronunciation comes from the Cantonese pronunciation "chaomin"; the term first appeared in English (US) in 1906. The term 'chow mein' means 'stir-fried noodles', also loosely translating to "fried noodles" in English, chow meaning 'stir-fried' (or "sautéed") and mein meaning 'noodles'.

Regional cuisine

American Chinese cuisine

Chaomian was introduced from China into the United States by Chinese immigrants who came from the Guangdong provinces in the California 1849 Gold Rush era bringing with them their Cantonese style of cooking.

In American Chinese cuisine, it is a stir-fried dish consisting of noodles, meat (chicken being most common but pork, beef, shrimp or tofu sometimes being substituted), onions and celery. It is often served as a specific dish at westernized Chinese restaurants. Vegetarian or vegan chow mein is also common.

In the American market, two types of chow mein include crispy chow mein and steamed chow mein.

The steamed chow mein has a softer texture, while the former is crisper and drier.  Crispy chow mein uses fried, flat noodles, while soft chow mein uses long, rounded noodles.

Crispy chow mein either has onions and celery in the finished dish or is served "strained", without any vegetables. Steamed chow mein can have many different kinds of vegetables in the finished dish, most commonly including onions and celery but sometimes carrots, cabbage and mung bean sprouts as well.  Crispy chow mein is usually topped with a thick brown sauce, while steamed chow mein is mixed with soy sauce before being served.

There is a regional difference in the US between the East and West Coast use of the term "chow mein". On the East Coast, "chow mein" is always the crispy kind. At some restaurants located in those areas, the crispy chow mein noodles are sometimes deep fried and could be crispy "like the ones in cans" or "fried as crisp as hash browns". At a few East Coast locations, "chow mein" is also served over rice. There, the steamed style using soft noodles is a separate dish called  "lo mein".  On the West Coast, "chow mein" is always the steamed style, and the term "lo mein" is not widely used.

The crispy version of chow mein can also be served in a hamburger-style bun as a chow mein sandwich.

There are also variations on how either one of the two main types of chow mein can be prepared as a dish. When ordering "chow mein" in some restaurants in Chicago, a diner might receive "chop suey poured over crunchy fried noodles". In Philadelphia, Americanized chow mein tends to be similar to chop suey but has crispy fried noodles on the side and includes much celery and bean sprouts and is sometimes accompanied with fried rice. Jeremy Iggers of the Star Tribune describes "Minnesota-style chow mein" as "a green slurry of celery and ground pork topped with ribbons of gray processed chicken". Bay Area journalist William Wong made a similar comment about what is sold as chow mein in places like Minnesota. A published recipe for Minnesota-style chow mein includes generous portions of celery and bean sprouts. Another Minnesotan variant includes ground beef and cream of mushroom soup. In Louisiana, "Cajun chow mein" is actually a noodle-less rice dish that is a variation of jambalaya.

Food historians and cultural anthropologists have noted that chow mein and other dishes served in Chinese American restaurants located away from areas without any significant Asian American population tend to be very different from what is served in China and are heavily modified to fit the taste preference of the local dominant population. As an example, the chow mein gravy favored in the Fall River area more closely resembles that used in local New England cooking than that used in traditional Chinese cooking. The creator of canned chow mein, who founded the food manufacturer Chun King, admits to using Italian spices to make his product more acceptable to Americans whose ancestors came from Europe.

In 1946, one of the first companies to market "chow mein" in a can was Chun King. The product's creator was Jeno Paulucci, the son of Italian immigrants, who developed a recipe based mostly upon Italian spices that would be better catered to the food preferences of European immigrants and some Americans of similar ethnic origins. To keep cost down, Paulucci replaced expensive water chestnuts with lower-cost celery stalks that were originally destined for cattle feed. Paulucci's company became so successful selling canned chow mein and chop suey that President Gerald Ford quipped, "What could be more American than a business built on a good Italian recipe for chop suey?" when praising Paulucci accomplishments with Chun King. After Paulucci sold Chun King in 1966, the company would be sold several more times more until it was dissolved in 1995.

By 1960, Paulucci described in The New York Times that "At Chun King we have turned out a 'stew-type' chow mein.  I'd guess this type has been around for thirty - maybe forty - years.  To make it, all the meat, seasonings and vegetables are dumped into a kettle and stewed for hours - until everything is cooked."

Outside of Chinese restaurants, what is labeled as chow mein is actually a chop suey-like stew that has very little resemblance to actual chow mein. As an example the official U.S. military recipe (which is employed by cooking facilities of all four American military services) does not include noodles and has instructions to serve the dish over steamed rice and can serve 100 persons per batch.

Australian cuisine
Outside of Asian communities, many Australians appear to confuse chow mein with chop suey.  The most common Australian version contains mince beef (called ground beef in North America) and curry powder and sometimes served over rice instead of fried noodles. This version has been promoted by the Australian Institute of Sport, on ABC radio, and a popular Australian women's magazine since the mid-1960s and during the 21st century.

Canadian Chinese cuisine
Canadian westernized Chinese restaurants may offer up to three different types of chow mein, none of which is identical to either of the two types of American chow mein. Cantonese style chow mein contains deep-fried crunchy golden egg noodles, green peppers, pea pods, bok choy, bamboo shoots, water chestnuts, shrimp, Chinese roast pork (char siu), chicken, and beef, and is served in a thick sauce. Plain chow mein is similar to other Western chow meins but contains far more mung bean sprouts; some regional recipes may substitute bean sprouts for noodles completely. The Japanese Canadian community also have their own version of chow mein that might include dried seaweed and pickle ginger and could be served in a bun.

In Newfoundland, their chow mein does not contain any noodles. In place of noodles, cabbage cut in such a way to resemble noodles are used as a substitute. Although no one knows the reason why this change had occurred, it is believed that the island remoteness in the North Atlantic during its history as an independent self-governing British dominion contributed to the lack of availability of the necessary ingredients from the rest of North America or from Europe.

Caribbean Chinese cuisine
Many West Indian people include chow mein in their cuisine, especially peoples from islands like Trinidad and Tobago and Jamaica which include a significant ethnic Chinese population; much of the cooking has infused itself into the population in general. As well, in the South American Caribbean countries Guyana and Suriname (known by its Dutch name "tjauw min" or "tjauwmin"). These chow mein dishes are cooked in a similar manner, with green beans, carrots, peas, onions and sometimes other vegetables. Meat used is mostly chicken but sometimes pork or shrimp. The Surinamese version may use a pork sausage as the meat. The main difference is that local spices are added, and the dish is often served with hot Scotch bonnet peppers or pepper sauce.

In Cuba, aside from the foreign-owned tourist hotels which often serve Western-style Chinese food, local Chinese restaurants can be found in Havana that offer a distinct Cuban style.

Central America
In Panama, chow mein is prepared with a mixture of onions, peppers, celery and carrots with pork or chicken and stir fried with noodles. Another recipe includes canned corn. In El Salvador, chow mein may contain carrots, cabbage, and/or broccoli.

Indian Chinese cuisine

Chow mein is also common in Indian Chinese, Bangladeshi Chinese,  and Pakistani Chinese cuisine. In India, it was introduced by the Chinese of Calcutta. It is usually offered Hakka-style, with gravy. Catering to vegetarian diets, there is an Indian variant, vegetable chow mein, which consists of noodles with cabbage, bamboo shoots, pea pods, green peppers, and carrots.  In the New Delhi area, chow mein can sometimes include paneer with the mixture of noodles and vegetables. Another non-meat Indian variant includes scrambled egg as a protein source. Kolkata has its own variant that is called Calcutta Chow Mein or Calcutta Chowmin that also includes green chilli, chilli garlic, or hot garlic. The Pakistani version includes carrots, cabbage, peppers, spring onions, chilies, and ginger garlic paste.

Indonesian Chinese cuisine

There are two Indonesian versions of chow mein. One is Mie goreng, which is (sometimes spicy) stir-fried noodle dish with variants of toppings, and the other is a crispy noodle dish topped with sauce that is pretty popular and existed in virtually all Chinese restaurant in Indonesia. It goes popular with the name of I fu mie or Mi Siram, literally means drenched noodle, in Indonesian Chinese cuisine. In Indonesia, i fu mie is usually served with thick egg sauce with cauliflower, broccoli, mushroom, kekkian or prawn cake, and chicken. Several varieties does exists such as vegetarian and seafood that contains squid, prawn and fish instead of kekkian. The dish is often confused with Lo mein.

Mauritian cuisine 
In Mauritius, Mauritian chow mein is known as "mine frire", "mine frite", "mine frit" and "minn frir". The term is a combination of Cantonese/Hakka word for noodles "mein" and french word for "fried". It was likely introduced in Mauritius by Chinese immigrants who mostly came from the Southeast part of China (mostly from the Cantonese regions) at the end of the 19th century. It was mainly eaten by the Chinese community who settled in Mauritius and eventually evolved in a distinctively Mauritian dish diverging from the original recipe. It is a classical Sino-Mauritian dish which is eaten by all Mauritians regardless of ethnicity, reflecting the influence of Chinese and/or Sino-Mauritian community despite being one the smallest community on the island. It is a very common street food and can be found in almost all restaurants on the island.

Mexican Chinese cuisine

Chow mein has gained popularity in Mexico, which received waves of Chinese immigrants in the past, particularly in northwestern Mexico. Mexicali, a city in Baja California, is known for its distinct style of chow mein, which typically use Mexican ingredients as substitutes for traditional Chinese ones, an adaption that was made by Chinese immigrants settling the area.

Nepalese cuisine

Tibetans who settled in Nepal brought chow mein with them. It is a popular fast food in Nepal. The Newari people of the Kathmandu Valley use water buffalo meat and chicken in their cuisine, and chow mein in Nepal is often cooked with onion, vegetables and buff (water buffalo meat).

Peruvian Chinese cuisine

Chinese food (chifa) is very popular in Peru and is now a part of mainstream Peruvian culture. Chow mein is known to Peruvians as tallarín saltado and may contain peppers, onions, green onions, and tomatoes. Chicken or beef are the preferred meats used in this Peruvian variant.

See also

 Chinese noodles
 Chop suey
Chow fun
 Chow mein sandwich
 Fried noodles
 List of Chinese dishes
 Lo mein
 Mein gon 
 Mie goreng 
 Pancit
 Yakisoba

References 

American Chinese cuisine
Australian Chinese cuisine
Canadian Chinese cuisine
New Zealand Chinese cuisine
Polynesian Chinese cuisine
Indian Chinese cuisine
Cantonese cuisine
Peruvian cuisine
Cantonese words and phrases
Chinese noodle dishes
Fried noodles